Percy Edwin Ludgate (2 August 1883 – 16 October 1922) was an Irish amateur scientist who designed the second analytical engine (general-purpose Turing-complete computer) in history.

Life 
Ludgate was born on 2 August 1883 in Skibbereen, County Cork, to Michael Ludgate and Mary McMahon. In the 1901 census, he is listed as Civil Servant National Education (Boy Copyist) in Dublin. In the 1911 census, he is also in Dublin, as a Commercial Clerk (Corn Merchant). He studied accountancy at Rathmines College of Commerce, earning a gold medal based on the results his final examinations in 1917.  At some date before or after then, he joined Kevans & Son, accountants.

Work on analytical engine 
It seems that Ludgate worked as a clerk for an unknown corn merchants, in Dublin, and pursued his interest in calculating machines at night. Charles Babbage in 1843 and Ludgate in 1909 designed the only two mechanical analytical engines before the electromechanical analytical engine of Leonardo Torres y Quevedo of 1920 and its few successors, and the six first-generation electronic analytical engines of 1949. 

Working alone, Ludgate designed an analytical engine while unaware of Babbage's designs, although he later went on to write about Babbage's machine.  Ludgate's engine used multiplication as its base mechanism (unlike Babbage's which used addition). It incorporated the first multiplier-accumulator, and was the first to exploit a multiplier-accumulator to perform division, using multiplication seeded by reciprocal, via the convergent series . 

Ludgate's engine also used a mechanism similar to slide rules, but employing his unique discrete Logarithmic Indexes (now known as Irish logarithms), and provided a very novel memory using concentric cylinders, storing numbers as displacements of rods in shuttles.  His design featured several other novel features, including for program control (e.g., preemption and subroutines – or microcode, depending on viewpoint). The design is so different from Babbage's as to be a second type of analytical engine, preceding the third (electromechanical) and fourth (electronic) types. The engine's precise mechanism is unknown as the only written accounts which survive do not detail its workings, although he stated in 1914 that "[c]omplete descriptive drawings of the machine exist, as well as a description in manuscript" – these have never been found.

Ludgate was one of a few independent workers in the field of science and mathematics. His inventions were worked on outside a lab.  He worked on them only part-time, often until the early hours of the morning. Many publications refer to him as an accountant, but that came eight years after his 1909 analytical engine paper.  Little is known about his personal life, as his only records are his scientific writings.  Until 2016 the best source of information about Ludgate and his significance lie in the work of Professor Brian Randell. As from then, a further investigation is underway at Trinity College, Dublin under the auspices of the John Gabriel Byrne Computer Science Collection.

Ludgate died of pneumonia in 19 October 1922, and is buried in Mount Jerome Cemetery in Dublin.

Legacy

In 1991, a prize for the best final-year project in the Moderatorship in computer science course at Trinity College, Dublin – the Ludgate Prize – was instituted in his honour,  and in 2016 the Ludgate Hub e-business incubation centre was opened in Skibbereen, where he was born.

In October 2022, a plaque from the National Committee for Commemorative Plaques in Science and Technology was unveiled at Ludgate's home in Drumcondra by the Provost of Trinity College, Linda Doyle.

References

Bibliography
   Available on-line at:  Fano.co.UK
 
  (A subscription to the journal or payment on a per-article basis is required to view this article) – full version
 
 
In: online catalog of The John Gabriel Byrne Computer Science Collection
  (see also )
  (see also )
  online catalog
  Mobile-friendly Ludgate folder of the above catalog
  (see Book Depository , also see BookFinder )

1883 births
1922 deaths
People from Skibbereen
20th-century Irish businesspeople
20th-century Irish scientists
Irish inventors
Businesspeople from Dublin (city)
Scientists from Dublin (city)
Computer designers
Deaths from pneumonia in the Republic of Ireland
Burials at Mount Jerome Cemetery and Crematorium